Andaina is a feminist magazine published in Santiago de Compostela, Galicia, Spain. The magazine was launched in 1983. Its subtitle is Revista galega de pensamento feminista. The magazine is published in Galician language and covers feminist themes. It also publishes interviews with leading female figures.

In March 2021 thirteen issues of Andaina covering the period of 1999–2003 were digitized by the University of Barcelona.

References

External links

1983 establishments in Spain
Feminism in Spain
Feminist magazines
Galician-language mass media
Magazines established in 1983
Mass media in Santiago de Compostela
Women's magazines published in Spain